Medical College Campus Church is situated in Thiruvananthapuram district, India, adjacent to the Regional Cancer Centre.

Churches in Thiruvananthapuram district
Pentecostalism in India